Thomas Rudge (baptised 1753 – 1825) was an English churchman, topographer and antiquarian, Archdeacon of Gloucester from 1814, and chancellor of the diocese of Hereford from 1817.

Life
The son of Thomas Rudge of Gloucester, Thomas Rudge the younger entered Merton College, Oxford, on 7 April 1770 at aged 16. He graduated with a B.A. degree in 1780.  St. Rudge received a master's degree from Worcester College, Oxford in 1783 and a B.D. in 1784.

Rudge was appointed rector of St. Michael's Church and St. Mary-de-Grace Church, Gloucester.  With the support of Philip Yorke, 2nd Earl of Hardwicke, Rudge became vicar of Haresfield, Gloucestershire.

In 1814, Rudge was appointed archdeacon of Gloucester.  In 1817, he was made chancellor of the diocese of Hereford.

Rudge died in 1825.

Works
Rudge published:

 The History of the County of Gloucester, compressed and brought down to the year 1803, 2 vols., Gloucester, 1803. 
 A General View of the Agriculture of the County of Gloucester, 1807. 
 The history and antiquities of Gloucester, from the earliest period to the present time: &c., 1811.

See also
Samuel Rudder

Notes

 
Attribution
 

1753 births
1825 deaths
19th-century English Anglican priests
Archdeacons of Gloucester
English antiquarians
English topographers
People from Gloucester
Alumni of Merton College, Oxford
Historians of Gloucestershire
18th-century English Anglican priests